Carausius proximus is a species of phasmid.

References

External links

Phasmatodea